Savage Press is a publishing company located in Brule, Wisconsin. Its first book was published in 1989. There are more than 200 titles on its list.

Early history 

The company's first publication was The Northern Reader (also known as TNR), a literary magazine that was the outgrowth of a writers group in Solon Springs, Wisconsin. The publication's volunteer staff included Judi James, Mary Brooks, Hazel Sangster and others. The first issue was released to 240 subscribers and local (Superior, Wisconsin-Duluth, Minnesota) newsstands and retailers. The magazine published 12 to 36 pages of fiction and poetry quarterly in an 8.5 x 11 saddle stitched glossy magazine format and attracted submissions from around the U.S. and world. It ceased publication in the spring of 1996.

The first Savage Press book, published in 1994, was Stop in the Name of the Law by Alex O'Kash from Lake Nebagamon, Wisconsin.

Growth 

Savage Press expanded from local interest publishing to national level book publishing as authors from around the U.S. (and the world) submitted manuscripts. The company published various novelists from around the US and internationally including John F. Saunders.  It also published children's books, poetry, books on music and on video.

References

External links 

http://www.savpress.com/cmt.asp.

1989 establishments in Wisconsin
Publishing companies of the United States